William MacKintosh MacLeod (15 June 1861, Glasgow30 June 1931, Kensington, London) was a Scotland international rugby union player.

Rugby Union career

Amateur career

He went to Fettes College in 1873.

He played for Fettesian-Lorettonians. He was the Secretary of the club in 1886.

He went to Trinity College and played rugby union for Cambridge University.

He came back to Edinburgh and studied at Edinburgh University.

He turned out for Glasgow Academicals in 1885.

He then played for Edinburgh Wanderers.

Provincial career

He played for Edinburgh District against Glasgow District in the inter-city match of 4 December 1886.

That same season, on 29 January 1887, he played for East of Scotland District in their match against West of Scotland District.

International career

William was a rugby union forward who played twice for Scotland in the 1886 Home Nations Championship. He was on the winning side on both occasions.

Business career

He became the manager of a Fine Arts insurance company in Manchester. He also became the local chairman of the Royal Society of the Prevention of Cruelty to Children there.

He practised as a stockbroker. He practised at Fielding, Son and Macleod; where he was a senior partner.

Family

He was the third and youngest son of The Very Rev. Norman MacLeod (1812-1872) and Catherine Ann MacLeod (née MacKintosh) (1824-1903), and the seventh of their eight children. Norman Macleod was minister of the Barony Church in Glasgow. One of his brothers was Sir John MacLeod MP.  On 8 January 1902, he married Constance Helen Sellar (1859-1928).  His wife, known as Eppie, predeceased him. She was the daughter of the Professor of Latin at Edinburgh University, W. Y. Sellar.

References

1861 births
1931 deaths
Rugby union players from Glasgow
Scotland international rugby union players
Fettesian-Lorretonian rugby union players
Edinburgh Wanderers RFC players
Edinburgh District (rugby union) players
East of Scotland District players
Cambridge University R.U.F.C. players
Glasgow Academicals rugby union players
Rugby union forwards